Zdravko Šotra (born 13 February 1933) is a Serbian film and television director and screenwriter. He is known for directing the films Zona Zamfirova, Boj na Kosovu, Šešir profesora Vujića, Santa Maria della Salute among others, as well as television mini-series.

Early life
Šotra was born in the village of Kozice, near Stolac (modern Bosnia and Herzegovina), into an ethnic Serb family as the seventh child of Mara and Đorđe Šotra. As a young child his family moved to Kosovo just prior to the outbreak of World War II, where he would grow up.

Career
Šotra graduated from the Faculty of Dramatic Arts, University of Arts in Belgrade with a degree in film directing. He began his professional career at TV Belgrade, working there since its inception. 

His film Zona Zamfirova (2002) was watched by a record 1.2 million people in Serbia.

He has directed several television mini-series based on novels by Mir-Jam: Ranjeni orao, Greh njene majke, Nepobedivo srce and Samac u braku.

Personal life
Šotra was married to the former beauty queen Nikica Marinović. Together they have a son Marko who is a television director employed at the Serbian state television.

He is a fan of Red Star Belgrade.

Filmography
Films
Osvajanje slobode (1979)
Šesta brzina (1981)
Idemo dalje (1982)
Igmanski marš (1983)
Držanje za vazduh (1985)
Braća po materi (1988)
Boj na Kosovu (1989)
Dnevnik uvreda 1993 (1994)
Barking at the Stars (1998)
Zona Zamfirova (2002)
Pljačka Trećeg rajha (2004)
Ivkova slava (2005)
Šešir profesora Vujića (2012) (Professor Kosta Vujic's Hat)
Santa Maria della Salute (2016)

Series
Više od igre (1976)
Gde cveta limun žut (2006)
Ranjeni orao (2008-2009)
Greh njene majke (2009-2010)
Nepobedivo srce (2011-2012)
 Alexander of Yugoslavia (2021)

References

External links

Interview published in Politika Newspaper

1933 births
Living people
20th-century Serbian people
Serbian film directors
Serbian television directors
Serbian film producers
Bosnia and Herzegovina film directors
Bosnia and Herzegovina film producers
Yugoslav film directors
Yugoslav film producers
Serbs of Bosnia and Herzegovina
People from Stolac